Black Cobra is an American heavy metal duo from San Francisco. The band was formed in 2001 by former Cavity guitarist Jason Landrian and Acid King bassist and Gammera guitarist Rafael Martinez. Their first release, a self-titled and self-released 7-inch EP, containing the three tracks "Interceptor", "Fall and Fall Again", and "Silverback", was engineered by Martinez and issued on August 27, 2004.

Members
 Jason Landrian – guitar, vocals
 Rafael "Rafa" Martinez – drums

Discography
Studio albums
 Bestial (2006, At a Loss Recordings)
 Feather and Stone (2007, At a Loss)
 Chronomega (2009, Southern Lord Records)
 Invernal (2011, Southern Lord)
 Imperium Simulacra (2016, Season of Mist)

EPs
 Black Cobra (2004, self-released)
 split with Eternal Elysium (2007, Diwphalanx Records)

Compilation appearances
Metal Swim (2010)

References

External links
 Official website

American doom metal musical groups
American sludge metal musical groups
Heavy metal musical groups from California
Heavy metal duos
2002 establishments in California
Musical groups established in 2002
Season of Mist artists